The Northampton and Rutland Militia was a militia regiment in the United Kingdom from 1860 to 1881, when it was transferred into the Northamptonshire Regiment.

The regiment was formed in 1860 by the amalgamation of the Northampton Militia and the Rutland Militia, and was ranked as the 48th regiment of militia. In 1874 the regiment was split into two battalions, and in 1881, under the Childers Reforms, these were transferred into The Northamptonshire Regiment as the 3rd and 4th Battalions.

In 1899 these were amalgamated into a single battalion, the 3rd, which was embodied in January 1900 during the Second Boer War. It was disembodied at the end of that year, but re-embodied in April 1902, when it left for service in South Africa. Following the end of the war two months later, 635 officers and men of the 3rd battalion left Cape Town on the SS Scot in early September, and returned to Northampton after arrival in the United Kingdom later the same month.

During the Haldane Reforms in 1908 the battalion was transferred to the Special Reserve, and was embodied on mobilisation in 1914 for the First World War. As with all Special Reserve battalions, it served as a regimental depot, and was disembodied following the end of hostilities in 1919. The battalion nominally remained in existence throughout the Second World War, but was never activated, and was finally disbanded in 1953.

References
Northampton and Rutland Militia, regiments.org

Infantry regiments of the British Army
Military units and formations established in 1860
Military units and formations of the Second Boer War
Military history of Rutland
Military units and formations in Northamptonshire
Military units and formations disestablished in 1881